Enemymine was a Washington-state-based indie rock band known for their very loud and abrasive music. The band consisted of three members; two bass guitarists and a drummer. Mike Kunka of godheadSilo played bass and provided vocals on all songs, while Zak Sally from Low also played bass and Danny Sasaki played drums. Ryan Baldoz replaced Sally on bass on "The Ice in Me." Enemymine has played shows with Jucifer, Melvins, Mindless Self Indulgence, Burning Brides, the Rapture, Melt Banana, among others. Before breaking up, the band released a self-titled EP on K Records and a full length, 'The Ice in Me' on Up Records.

Discography 

Studio albums
The Ice In Me (Up Records, 2000)

EPs
Enemymine (K Records, 1999)

External links
 Enemymine on Discogs

American noise rock music groups
Musical groups from Washington (state)
Up Records
K Records artists